Olavinlinna (also known as St. Olaf's Castle; ; ; literally Olof's Castle) is a 15th-century three-tower castle located in Savonlinna, Finland. It is built on an island in the Kyrönsalmi strait that connects the lakes Haukivesi and Pihlajavesi. It is the northernmost medieval stone fortress still standing.
The castle forms a spectacular stage for the Savonlinna Opera Festival, held for the first time in the summer 1912.

History 

The fortress was founded by Erik Axelsson Tott in 1475 under the name Sankt Olofsborg in an effort to profit from the political turmoil following Ivan III's conquest of the Novgorod Republic. It was sited in Savonia so as to lay claim to the Russian side of the border established by the Treaty of Nöteborg.

One of Tott's letters from 1477 includes a passing mention of foreign builders invited to Olofsborg, probably from Reval, where the city fortifications were being extended. It was the first Swedish castle provided with a set of thickset circular towers that could withstand cannon fire. It is not by accident that a network of lakes and waterways forms the setting for the castle, for these would seriously impede a prospective Russian offensive.

The three-towered keep was completed in 1485, and the construction of the outer curtain walls with two towers was initiated immediately. They were completed in 1495. The castle is roughly a truncated rhomboid with keep on the western side of the island and the curtain walls and outer bailey to east. One of the towers of the keep, St. Erik's Tower, has a bad foundation and has since collapsed. One of the towers of Bailey, the Thick Tower, exploded in the 18th century. A bastion has been built on its place. The castle was converted into a Vaubanesque fort in the late 18th century with bastions.

 Keep
 Outer Bailey
 Bell Tower (St. Virgin's Tower)
 Church Tower (St. Olof's Tower)
 Kijl's Tower
 Thick Bastion (on place of Thick Tower)
 Ruins of the collapsed St Erik's Tower
 Bell Bastion (semi-bastion)
 Gateway Curtain
 Watergate Curtain
 Curtain wall
 Smallgate Bastion
 Suvorov's Bailey

Warfare 
Olofsborg withstood several sieges by the Russians during the First and Second Russian-Swedish wars. A brisk trade developed under the umbrella of the castle towards the end of the 16th century, giving birth to the town of Savonlinna, which was chartered in 1639.

While the castle was never captured by force, its garrison agreed to terms of surrender twice; first to invading Russians on 28 July 1714 and the second time on 8 August 1743, with the latter conflict's peace treaty in form of the Treaty of Åbo leading to the castle and the entire region being seceded to Empress Elizabeth of Russia. During the Russian era Alexander Suvorov personally inspected rearmament of the fortress.

Several devastating fires destroyed much of the castle's decor in the 19th century, all of its original furnishings were destroyed.

Tourism 
The castle hosts several small exhibitions, including the Castle Museum which displays artifacts found in the castle or related to it, and the Orthodox Museum which displays icons and other religious artifacts both from Finland and Russia.

Olavinlinna is the initial model for Kropow Castle in the bande dessinée King Ottokar's Sceptre, an album in the series of Adventures of Tintin created by Hergé.

Gallery

See also
 Brahe Castle

References

External links 

 St. Olaf's Castle at the Finnish National Board of Antiquities
 Savonlinna Opera Festival – Official website
 Medieval castles in Finland
 The Association of Castles and Museums around the Baltic Sea

Castles in Finland
Savonlinna
Buildings and structures in South Savo
Museums in South Savo
History museums in Finland
Religious museums in Finland
History of South Savo
Water castles
Churches dedicated to Saint Olav in Finland